The Pokotciminikew River is a tributary of the North Shore of the Kakospictikweak River, flowing into the territory of the town of La Tuque, in the administrative region of Mauricie, in Quebec, Canada. The course of this river successively crosses the cantons of Pfister, Balete and Mathieu.

Forestry is the main economic activity of this valley; recreational tourism activities, second. The valley of this river is served by a few branches of forest roads.

The surface of the Pokotciminikew River is usually frozen from mid-November to the end of April, however safe ice circulation is generally from early December to late March.

Geography

Toponymy 
The toponym "Rivière Pokotciminikew" was formalized on September 6, 1984 at the Commission de toponymie du Québec.

Notes and references

See also 

Rivers of Mauricie
Tributaries of the Saint-Maurice River
La Tuque, Quebec